Aedes epactius is a species of mosquito (Culicidae) native to North America. Some mosquitoes in North America, such as Aedes albopictus and Aedes aegypti  have a similar scutellum pattern.

Diet
Like other mosquito species, female Aedes epactius take blood meal to develop their eggs. Apart from blood-feeding, they feed on nectar and other sweet plant juices.

References

epactius
Insect vectors of human pathogens